The National Library of the Seychelles was declared the national library in 1978. The library was originally opened in 1910 and named the Carnegie Library. It is the legal deposit and copyright library for Seychelles.
The building was closed in 2012, 2013, and 2016 due to issues with mold. The library is currently closed and is due to reopen in 2023 with renovations to modernize the building and prevent future mold problems.

See also 
 List of national libraries

References

External links 
 http://www.national-library.edu.sc

Seychellois culture
Seychelles
Libraries in Seychelles
Libraries established in 1910
1910 establishments in Seychelles
Library buildings completed in 1910
Carnegie libraries